Sanne Margaret Elisabeth Caarls (born March 16, 1998) is a Dutch born–American field hockey player.

Personal life
Sanne Caarls was born in the Netherlands and grew up in the town Nieuw-Vennep. She was born to a Dutch father and an American mother.

Career

National team
Following months of training with the Dutch development squad, Caarls made the move to the United States to represent her mother's home country. She made her debut for the national team during season three of the FIH Pro League against her home nation, the Netherlands.

In 2023 Caarls was officially added to the national squad, and named in the team for season four of the FIH Pro League.

References

External links

1998 births
Living people
American female field hockey players
Female field hockey midfielders
HC Bloemendaal players